Liga Deportiva Universitaria de Quito's 2011 season was the club's 81st year of existence, the 58th year in professional football, and the 50th in the top level of professional football in Ecuador. Liga came in as the defending Serie A champion and having qualified to the 2011 Copa Libertadores and the 2011 Copa Sudamericana, but failed to win a title for the first time since 2006.

Club

Personnel
President: Carlos Arroyo
Honorary President: Rodrigo Paz
President of the Executive Commission: Esteban Paz
President of the Football Commission: Edwin Ripalda
Vice-President of the Football Commission: Patricio Torres
Sporting manager: Santiago Jácome

Coaching staff
Manager: Edgardo Bauza
Assistant manager: José Daniel di Leo
Physical trainer: Alejandro Mur
Goalkeeper trainer: Gustavo Flores
Statistician: Maximiliano Bauza

Kits
Supplier: Umbro
Sponsor(s): Diners Club International, Chevrolet, Coca-Cola

Squad information
Liga's squad for the season is allowed a maximum of four foreign players at any one time, and a maximum of eight throughout the season. During the off season, Norberto Araujo changed his nationality from Argentine to Ecuadorian. At the start of the season, Liga was mandated to start one under-18 player in each match. Since the Ecuadorian national U-20 team qualified to the 2011 FIFA U-20 World Cup, that was changed to have an under-20 player start in each game. The jersey numbers in the main table (directly below) refer to the number on their domestic league jersey. The under-18/under-20 players will wear a jersey number of at least #50. For each CONMEBOL competition, Liga must register 25 players, whose jerseys will be numbered 1–25. Because of this, some players may have different jersey numbers while playing in CONMEBOL matches.

Note: Caps and goals are of the national league and are current as of the beginning of the season.

Winter transfers
During the off-season, Liga saw a number of high-profile players leave the squad. Veterans Carlos Espínola, Renan Calle, and Christian Lara left the team to look for more playing time, while Juan Manuel Salgueiro returned to Estudiantes after Liga could not secure a permanent move. Víctor Estupiñán and Joao Plata and went to the United States to take part in the MLS SuperDraft. They were drafted by Chivas USA and Toronto FC. Franklin Salas attempted to move abroad, but failed to find a suitor. After a prolonged process, he was loaned to Imbabura. Other loaned out players were Pedro Romo and Manuel Mendoza to Aucas and Universidad Católica, respectively. Ángel Cheme, better known as Gonzalo Chila, was suspended for two-year due to aggravated identity theft.

To reinforce the squad, Liga signed former stars Luis Bolaños and Enrique Vera, with Daniel Viteri returning after a season on loan. Argenis Moreira, Fernando Hidalgo, and Geovanny Caicedo were also signed. Liga's highest profile transfer was Ezequiel González from Fluminense. This also filled their squad's foreign player quota. Ángel Ledesma was loaned form Macará should the squad need U-18 down the line.

Summer transfers
On May 16, 2011, veteran goalkeeper José Francisco Cevallos announced his retirement from professional football. He played his last game on May 22. In late July, the club announced that Carlos Luna was loaned to a club to be determined at a later date. Youth-player Nelson Martínez was loaned to Aucas in mid June. That was followed by the late-July loan of forward Luis Batioja to Universidad Católica.

In late July, Liga reinforced their squad with two players transferring from Argentina. Forward Claudio Bieler returned to the club after a year-and-a-half on a loan from Racing. In the time in between, he became a naturalized Ecuadorian, freeing up a foreign-player spot in the team. The remaining foreign-player spot was filled by midfielder Lucas Acosta, who was transferring in from San Martín de San Juan.

Copa Libertadores squad

*Corozo replaced Enrique Gámez after the Second Stage.

Copa Sudamericana squad

*Jaramillo replaced Walter Chávez after the First Stage.

Competitions

Pre-season friendlies
Liga played three friendly matches in addition to La Noche Blanca, the club's official presentation for the season. Their opponent for La Noche Blanca was Once Caldas, the defending Colombian champion.

Serie A

The 2011 season is Liga's 50th season in the Serie A and their tenth consecutive. The league season will run from late January to early December, with a short break for the 2011 Copa América. The format is identical to the previous season. They came in as the defending league champion.

First stage
The First Stage of the season ran from January 30 to June 19. Liga finished 2nd and failed to qualify to the season-ending Finals and the 2012 Copa Libertadores during this stage.

Second stage
The Second Stage of the season began July 22 and is scheduled to end on December 4.

Third stage

Copa Libertadores

LDU Quito qualified to the 2011 Copa Libertadores—their 15th participation in the continental tournament—as the winner of the 2010 Serie A Second Stage and were given the Ecuador 1 berth as the league champion. They entered the competition in the Second Stage and were placed in Group 8 with Godoy Cruz, Independiente, Peñarol. They won their group and advance to the Round of 16 where they were eliminated by Vélez Sársfield.

Second stage

Round of 16

Vélez Sársfield won on points 6–0.

Copa Sudamericana

The 2011 Copa Sudamericana is being played in the second half of the season. Liga entered in the First Stage.

First stage

LDU Quito won on points 4–1.

Second stage

LDU Quito won on points 6–0.

Round of 16

Tied on points 3–3, LDU Quito won on goal difference.

Quarterfinals

Tied on points 3–3, LDU Quito won on penalties.

Semifinals

LDU Quito won on points 6–0.

Finals

Universidad de Chile won on points.

Other friendlies

Player statistics

Updated as of games played on December 19, 2011.Note: Players in italics left the club mid-season.Source:

See also
2011 in Ecuadorian football

References

External links
Official website 
LDU Quito (3) - Barcelona SC (0)
LDU Quito (5) - Manta (0) 3rd goal
LDU Quito (1) - Deportivo Cuenca (0)
Manta (1) - LDU Quito (1)
LDU Quito (2) - Imbabura (0)
LDU Loja (3) - LDU Quito (2) 2nd goal
LDU Quito (1) - Deportivo Quito (0)
LDU Quito (4) - Deportivo Cuenca (1) 4th goal

2011
Ecuadorian football clubs 2011 season
2011 in Ecuador